Redwood Park is a suburb in the northeastern suburbs of Adelaide, South Australia.

History
Redwood Park was established in 1959 based on an earlier private subdivision of section 1591 of the Hundred of Yatala by agreement between the District Council of Tea Tree Gully, the Postmaster General and the Nomenclature Committee at the time.

References

Suburbs of Adelaide